Mount Rowland is a mountain with a sharp-pointed summit rising to  in the central part of Rutmnherford Ridge, in the Saint Johns Range of Victoria Land. It was named by the Advisory Committee on Antarctic Names in 2007 after F. Sherwood Rowland, Professor of Chemistry at the University of California, Irvine, winner of the Nobel Prize in Chemistry for 1995.

The Royal Swedish Academy of Sciences awarded the 1995 Nobel Prize in Chemistry to Professor Paul Crutzen, Max-Planck-Institute for Chemistry, Mainz, Germany (Dutch citizen); Professor Mario Molina, Department of Earth, Atmospheric and Planetary Sciences and Department of Chemistry, MIT, Cambridge, MA, USA; and Professor F. Sherwood Rowland, Department of Chemistry, University of California, Irvine, CA, USA “for their work in atmospheric chemistry, particularly concerning the formation and decomposition of ozone.”

References

Rowland